The Kriva River (Kriva Reka) is a 75 km long river in northeastern North Macedonia, and the biggest left tributary of the Pčinja River.

The name Kriva Reka means "Curved River" in Macedonian.

Geography and tributaries 

From the spring to the first tributary of the Kiselička reka  ( from the source), the river flows northwest, then turns sharply to the southwest.

The major tributaries of the Kriva Reka are: Kiselicka reka, Gaberska reka, Raska reka, Rankovecka reka, Vetunicka reka, Drzava (or Rudjinska drzava), Zivusa, Duracka reka, Kratovska reka, Povisnica and Vrlej. It belongs to the Aegean sea drainage basin.

Bibliography
 Kvalitet na površinskite vodi vo slivot na Kriva reka, O. Dimitrovska, I.Milevski, Bilten za fizička geografija, Skopje, 2005.

References

Kriva reka, river
Osogovo
Waterfalls of North Macedonia